Vozzhayevka (also Vozzhayevka Northeast (US)) is an air base in Amur Oblast, Russia located about 100 km southeast of Blagoveshchensk.  It is a medium-sized air base located near an SS-11 missile field at Svobodnyy.  During the 1980s it was one of 17 airfields hosting the Soviet Union's tactical reconnaissance aircraft regiments.

Units stationed at Vozzhayevka include:
 293 ORAP (293rd Independent Aviation Reconnaissance Regiment) and 56 APIB (56rd Fighter-Bomber Aviation Regiment) flying Sukhoi Su-17M3R (NATO: Fitter) aircraft in the late 1980s  and the Mikoyan-Gurevich MiG-25 (NATO: Foxbat) until 1987.  The regiment was under 1 OA (1st Air Army, i.e. Far East Air Army).

History
In July 1948 the 10th Air Army was transferred from Sakhalin Island to Vozzhayevka.  One of the first U-2 flights over the region in 1958 revealed five Tupolev Tu-4 (NATO: Bull) bombers.

In the late 1960s, a runway extension and 30 new hardstands were added, and Mikoyan-Gurevich MiG-17 (NATO: Fresco) and Yakovlev Yak-25 (NATO: Mandrake) were being operated at the airfield.  An October 1972 reconnaissance satellite analysis showed six MiG-17, three Yakovlev Yak-28 (NATO: Brewer), three Mikoyan-Gurevich MiG-15UTI (NATO: Fagot) trainers, with small numbers of older fighters and transports.

By 1980, the airfield was operating Sukhoi Su-24 (NATO: Fencer-A) aircraft  By 1984 the Soviet Union had begun deploying advanced MiG-25R aircraft to the airfield, and a normal complement at the airfield then consisted of 5 to 16 MiG-25R and 7 to 11 MiG-21R reconnaissance aircraft.

An Ilyushin Il-76MD (NATO: Candid) destined for Vozzhayevka crash-landed at Astrakhan on June 20, 2000.

Satellite imagery from 2010 onward showed the base to abandoned, with the remains of several Su-24 Fencer aircraft strewn about the storage areas.

References

Soviet Air Force bases
Soviet Frontal Aviation
Soviet Air Defence Force bases
Russian Air Force bases